Susan Ticehurst is a New Hampshire politician.

Career
Ticehurst served in one of the New Hampshire House of Representatives seats representing the Carroll 3 district from December 5, 2012, to December 7, 2016. She lost the general election on November 8, 2016. On November 6, 2018, Ticehurst was again elected to the New Hampshire House of Representatives where she represents the Carroll 3 district. She assumed office on December 5, 2018. She is a Democrat.

Personal life
Ticehurst resides in Tamworth, New Hampshire.

References

Living people
People from Tamworth, New Hampshire
Women state legislators in New Hampshire
Democratic Party members of the New Hampshire House of Representatives
21st-century American politicians
21st-century American women politicians
Year of birth missing (living people)